Every garage operating services that form part of the London bus network has a one or two letter garage code. Such codes are not only for garages operating Transport for London contracts, but also to those operating commercial bus services under London bus agreements. There is also a code for Tramlink. The codes are used internally by London Buses, for administrative purposes.

History
Many of the codes are long-established, going back to London Buses Limited (LBL) (and in many cases earlier) days, and are well known among staff and enthusiasts. There is usually some sort of logic to the code allocated. In the early part of the 20th century, the London General Omnibus Company allocated its garages codes by going through the alphabet — initially A, B, C, etc.; and then AA, AB, AC, etc. Codes allocated since often reflect the geographical name of the garage (e.g. [[Fulwell bus garage|Fulwell]], Alperton), New Cross (NX).) although some have since been renamed (HT, Holloway, was called Highgate).

Since the start of tendering in 1985, some codes have also reflected the name of the owning company, examples being AH (Armchair, Brentford), EL (Eastern National, Chelmsford), WI (Wings, Uxbridge), BE (Blue Triangle, Rainham). Such company names may not still be in use today: DX (Arriva London North East, Barking) originates from Dix Travel, which was absorbed into Grey-Green, becoming its Dagenham operation, and subsequently relocated to Barking, and now absorbed by Arriva London. Similarly BT (Sovereign, Edgware) comes from BTS, which was subsequently bought out by Sovereign, and Hounslow Heath code WK originates from Westlink. The official code FR for Metrobus's Crayford base is especially obscure, referring to the original owner, one Chris Freeman of Freeman's Coaches, which was absorbed into Crystals, which subsequently sold out to Tellings-Golden Miller in 2003, who then sold it on to Metrobus in 2005.

In several cases (TB/TC/TL and QB) the code reflects both the location (Bromley/Croydon/Lewisham (Catford), Battersea) and the original owning company (Tilling, Q-Drive). For example TB is Tilling Bromley, QB is Q-Drive Battersea.

Some garage codes have been used for more than one garage over the years, sometimes when an entire garage has moved such as at Peckham (PM), and sometimes when a code has been dormant for some years and then been reused. Some premises have had different codes at different times in their life. Three garages (Ash Grove, Edgware and Fulwell) have two codes, one for each operator.

During the period of operation by London Transport and its predecessors, indeed back to the earliest motor buses in the early 20th century, the garage code was clearly carried on both sides of the vehicle. The code was usually in the form of a metal (later plastic) stencil plate carried in a holder beside the running duty number plate. Latterly, the garage codes took the form of painted stencils or adhesive characters. In the post London Transport/ London Buses period, the display of garage codes is no longer universal and many vehicles carry no visible identification.

There are a number of historical anomalies with the allocation of codes. When Ash Grove garage opened in 1981, it was coded AG by London Transport. As an operational garage that has opened and closed several times over the years, it now carries the code AE, formerly the code of the long closed Hendon garage and the AG''' code is currently unused.

Current codes

A

B

C

D

E

F

G

H

K

L

M

N

P

Q

R

S

T

U

V

W

X

Country Area

See also
 List of London bus and coach stations

References

External links
 Transport for London
 London Bus Garages
 LT Bus Garage Codes
 IAN'S BUS STOP

Bus garages in London